Suderman is a surname. Notable people with the surname include:

 Dick Suderman (1939–1972), Canadian Football League player
 Spencer Suderman (born 1966), American airshow performer

See also
 Sudermann

Russian Mennonite surnames